Domenico da Cese (27 March 1905 - 17 September 1978), born Emidio Petracca, was a monk who was a member of the Capuchin order.

Domenico da Cese was born as Emidio Petracca in Cese in the Kingdom of Italy. On 12 January 1915 at the age of nine while at school, he called out in class to his peers that there was going to be an earthquake that would strike that night; he was correct in this. He and his father were almost killed when their church collapsed on top of them. Both had to be pulled from the rubble to safety.

Emilio joined the Capuchin order and became a close friend of Padre Pio, a future saint. Padre Domenico became a believer and proponent of the Holy Face of Manoppello, eventually getting permission to live near the image.

In September 1978, when in Turin to visit the Shroud of Turin, the six foot tall Padre Domenico was hit by a young man driving a Fiat and died due to his injuries on 17 September 1978. He was buried in his hometown of Cese.

His sainthood cause commenced on 3 March 2015 and he has been given the title of Servant of God.

See also
Christian mystics

References 

1905 births
1978 deaths
Capuchins
Italian Christian monks
20th-century venerated Christians
Italian Servants of God